= United States Olympic national soccer team =

The United States Olympic national soccer team may refer to the:

- United States men's national under-23 soccer team
- United States women's national soccer team
